In Jainism, Pushpadanta, also known as Suvidhinatha, was the ninth Tirthankara of the present age (Avasarpini). According to Jain belief, he became a siddha and an arihant, a liberated soul that has destroyed all of its karma.

Biography
Puṣpadanta bhagwan, also known as Suvidhinatha, was the ninth Tirthankara of the present age (Avasarpini). According to Jain belief, they became a siddha and an arihant, a liberated soul that has destroyed all of its karma.

Puṣpadanta bhagwan was born to King Sugriva and Queen Rama at Kakandi (modern Khukhundoo, Deoria, Uttar Pradesh) to the Ikshvaku dynasty. Their birth date was the fifth day of the Margshrsha Krishna month of the Vikram Samvat. Puṣpadant bhagwan was the ninth Tirthankara who re-established the four-part sangha in the tradition started by Rishabhanatha bhagwan. Pushpadanta prabhu is associated with Alligator emblem, Malli tree, Ajita Yaksha and Mahakali (Dig.) & Sutaraka (Svet.) Yakshi.

See also

God in Jainism
Jainism and non-creationism

Notes

References
 
 
 

Tirthankaras
Solar dynasty